Ibrahim Orabi (1912 – 2 July 1957) was an Egyptian Greco-Roman wrestler. He competed as a middleweight at the 1936 Summer Olympics and as a light-heavyweight at the 1948 Games and finished in fifth and third place, respectively. Orabi finished in second place in the Mediterranean Games which held at Alexandia in 1951.

References

External links

1912 births
1957 deaths
Olympic wrestlers of Egypt
Wrestlers at the 1936 Summer Olympics
Wrestlers at the 1948 Summer Olympics
Egyptian male sport wrestlers
Olympic bronze medalists for Egypt
Olympic medalists in wrestling
Medalists at the 1948 Summer Olympics
Mediterranean Games silver medalists for Egypt
Mediterranean Games medalists in wrestling
20th-century Egyptian people